Raul Martínez Gárcia (born 27 June 1991 in Elche) is a Spanish taekwondo athlete. He won the gold medal at the 2018 Mediterranean Games on the Men's 80 kg weight category.

He represented Spain at the 2020 Summer Olympics in the men's 80 kg weight class.

References

External links
 

Spanish male taekwondo practitioners
Living people
1991 births
Universiade medalists in taekwondo
Mediterranean Games gold medalists for Spain
Mediterranean Games medalists in taekwondo
Competitors at the 2018 Mediterranean Games
Competitors at the 2022 Mediterranean Games
Universiade silver medalists for Spain
Taekwondo practitioners at the 2020 Summer Olympics
Olympic taekwondo practitioners of Spain
21st-century Spanish people